Osse may refer to:

 Osse, Doubs, a commune of the Doubs département, in France
 Ossé, a commune of the Ille-et-Vilaine département, in France
 Osse, Łódź Voivodeship (central Poland)
 Osse (river), a river in southwestern France
 Den Osse, a village in the Netherlands
 Office of the State Superintendent of Education in the District of Columbia Public Schools system (Washington, DC)
 OSSE, Oriented Scintillation Spectrometer Experiment

See also 
 OS (disambiguation)
 Oss
 Ossa (disambiguation)